Dangerous is a 1935 American drama film directed by Alfred E. Green and starring Bette Davis in her first Oscar-winning role. The screenplay by Laird Doyle is based on his story Hard Luck Dame.

Plot
Don Bellows, a prominent architect, is engaged to the beautiful and wealthy Gail Armitage when he meets down-and-out Joyce Heath, who was once the most promising young actress on Broadway. Don feels deeply indebted to Joyce because her performance as Juliet inspired him to become an architect.

While rehabilitating her, Don falls in love with the tempestuous actress. Joyce, convinced she destroys anything and anyone she touches, warns him she is a jinx. Compelled to save her, Don breaks his engagement to Gail and risks his fortune to back the actress in a Broadway show. Before opening night, he insists they marry, but Joyce resists his proposal, hiding the fact she is married to Gordon Heath, an ineffectual but devoted man who was financially ruined by their marriage.

Joyce goes to Gordon and begs him for a divorce. When he refuses, she causes an automobile accident that cripples him for life. Her own injuries keep her from opening in the show, which fails. Don is ruined, and when he learns that Joyce has deceived him, he accuses her of being a completely selfish woman, her only true jinx.

Joyce briefly considers suicide, but eventually sees the truth in Don's accusation. She re-opens the show and, although she truly loves Don, sends him away to marry Gail. The show is a success, and Joyce, now dedicated to a responsible life, goes to visit Gordon and salvage her marriage.

Cast
 Bette Davis as Joyce Heath
 Franchot Tone as Don Bellows
 Margaret Lindsay as Gail Armitage
 Alison Skipworth as Mrs. Williams
 John Eldredge as Gordon Heath
 Dick Foran as Teddy
 Walter Walker as Roger Farnsworth 
 Richard Carle as Pitt Hanley
 George Irving as Charles Melton 
 Pierre Watkin as George Sheffield 
 Douglas Wood as Elmont 
 William B. Davidson as Reed Walsh (as William Davidson)

Production
Bette Davis initially turned down the script, but Warner Bros. studio production chief Hal B. Wallis convinced her she could make something special out of the character, who had been inspired by one of Davis' idols, actress Jeanne Eagels.  In fact, one of the characters in the film mentions how Eagels and Davis character Joyce are the only two actresses who can play the lead in the play "But to Die". Davis was determined to look like an actress on the skids, and insisted Orry-Kelly design costumes appropriate for a woman who had seen better days. It was for this film Perc Westmore styled her hair in the bob cut she would favor for the rest of her life.

Based on Laird Doyle's short story Hard Luck Dame, the $194,000 film had six working titles before producer Hal B. Wallis decided on Dangerous. The other titles were Hard Luck Dame, Evil Star (which Davis favored), The Jinx Woman, Forever Ends a Dawn, Tomorrow Ends and But to Die.

Franchot Tone, who recently had completed Mutiny on the Bounty, was borrowed from Metro-Goldwyn-Mayer to bolster Davis' marquee value. Davis was immediately drawn to the actor, who was engaged to Joan Crawford at the time. Producer Harry Joe Brown later revealed he had walked in on Davis and Tone in a compromising position. Crawford apparently knew about the liaison, but didn't break the engagement. Most biographers believe this was the start of the lifelong feud between the two actresses, willingly portrayed in the 2017 anthology series, Feud.

Three songs by Harry Warren - "Forty-Second Street," "The Little Things You Used to Do," and "Sweet and Slow" - are heard on the soundtrack. The other song was "Bridal Chorus" by Richard Wagner.

In 1941, the film was remade as Singapore Woman as a second feature with Brenda Marshall in the lead role. It coincidentally utilized some of the sets from The Letter, the 1940 film starring Davis.

Davis won the Academy Award for Best Actress for her performance, but always felt it was a consolation prize for not having been nominated for Of Human Bondage the previous year. In 2002, Steven Spielberg anonymously bought the Oscar Davis had won at auction at Sotheby's and returned it to the Academy of Motion Picture Arts and Sciences. The statuette had been part of the memorabilia displayed by the Planet Hollywood restaurant chain.

Critical reception

The New York Times wrote "That Bette Davis has been unable to match the grim standard she set as Mildred in Of Human Bondage is not to her discredit. In Dangerous, she tries again. Except for a few sequences where the tension is convincing as well as deadly she fails...Say this for Miss Davis: she seldom lets down."

Variety wrote "Laird's dialog is adult, intelligent and has a rhythmic beat. Davis' performance is fine on the whole, despite a few imperfect moments. When called upon to reach an intense dramatic pitch without hysterics, Davis is capable of turning the trick. Yet there are moments in Dangerous when a lighter acting mood would be opportune."

Writing for The Spectator in 1936, Graham Greene gave the film a mixed review. Characterizing the story as "poor, [and] the ending atrociously sentimental", and criticizing Margaret Lindsay's portrayal of Gail, Greene also praised Bette Davis for her portrayal of Joyce, and concluded that the film was "a picture to see for [Bette Davis'] sake"—"unusual, but only because of Miss Davis."

Footnotes

References
Baxter, John. 1970. Hollywood in the Thirties. International Film Guide Series. Paperback Library, New York. LOC Card Number 68-24003.

External links

 
 
 
 

1935 films
American drama films
1935 drama films
Films directed by Alfred E. Green
Films featuring a Best Actress Academy Award-winning performance
American black-and-white films
Warner Bros. films
Films set in New York City
Films set in country houses
1930s American films
1930s English-language films